The 2014 WNBA season is the 7th season for the Atlanta Dream of the Women's National Basketball Association. This is also the first season the Dream has finished first in the East. In the last game of the Eastern Semis, the Dream had a 16-point lead at the end of the 3rd quarter, but unfortunately gave the other team the lead and lost 81-80.

Transactions

WNBA Draft

Trades and Roster Changes

Roster
{| class="toccolours" style="font-size: 95%; width: 100%;"
|-
! colspan="2" style="background:#6495ED;color:white;"|2014 Atlanta Dream Roster
|- style="text-align:center; background-color:#FF0000; color:#FFFFFF;"
! Players !! Coaches
|-
| valign="top" |
{| class="sortable" style="background:transparent; margin:0px; width:100%;"
! Pos. !! # !! Nat. !! Name !! Ht. !! Wt. !! From
|-

Schedule

Preseason

|- style="background:#cfc;"
| 1
| May 11
| @ New York
| 
| Tiffany Hayes (14)
| Érika de Souza (7)
| Shoni Schimmel (4)
| Philips Arena2444
| 1–0
|-

Regular season

|- bgcolor="bbffbb"
| 1 || May 16 || 7:30pm || San Antonio || SSO || W 79-75 || de Souza (23) || de Souza (11) || Shoni Schimmel (11) || Philips Arena  4,575 || 1-0
|- bgcolor="bbffbb"
| 2 || May 17 || 7:00pm || @ Indiana || FS-S || W 90-88 || McCoughtry (27) || Lyttle (21) || Schimmel (10) || Bankers Life Fieldhouse  8,275 || 2-0
|- bgcolor="ffbbbb"
| 3 || May 24 || 8:00pm || @ Chicago || || L 73-87 || de Souza (18) || de Souza (12) || Schimmel (8) || Allstate Arena  4,136 || 2-1
|- bgcolor="ffbbbb"
| 4 || May 25 || 6:00pm || Indiana || SSO || L 77-82 || McCoughtry (19) || de Souza (9) || Schimmel (8) || Philips Arena  5,517 || 2-2
|- bgcolor="bbffbb"
| 5 || May 30 || 7:30pm || Seattle || SSO || W 80-69 || Hayes (20) || Lyttle (10) || McCoughtry (8) || Philips Arena  5,486 || 3-2
|-

|- bgcolor="ffbbbb"
| 6 || June 1 || 3:00pm || @ Connecticut ||  || L 76-85 || Hayes (17) || de Souza (8) || Lyttle (3) || Mohegan Sun Arena  6,071 || 3-3
|- bgcolor="bbffbb"
| 7 || June 3 || 7:00pm || Los Angeles || ESPN2 || W 93-85 || de Souza (27) || Lyttle (12) || Schimmel (7) || Philips Arena  5,409 || 4-3
|- bgcolor="bbffbb"
| 8 || June 7 || 7:00pm || Chicago || SSO || W 97-59 || de Souza, McCoughtry (20) || Lyttle (12) || Dumerc (5) || Philips Arena  5,458 || 5-3
|- bgcolor="bbffbb"
| 9 || June 13 || 7:30pm || Minnesota || SSO || W 85-82 || McCoughtry (23) || Lyttle (12) || Dumerc (7) || Philips Arena  6,684|| 6-3
|- bgcolor="bbffbb"
| 10 || June 15 || 4:00pm || @ Washington ||  || W 75-67  || de SouzaMcCoughtry (16) || de Souza (9) || McCoughtry (5) || Verizon Center 7,229 || 7-3
|- bgcolor="bbffbb"
| 11 || June 18 || 12:00pm || Washington || FS-S || W 83-73 || McCoughtry (27) || Lyttle (10) || McCoughtry (4) || Philips Arena 8,895 || 8-3
|- bgcolor="bbffbb"
| 12 || June 15 || 8:00pm || @ Chicago || CN100 || W 93-86 || Castro Marques (31) || de Souza (13) || Lehning (9) || Allstate Arena  3,292 || 9-3
|- bgcolor="ffbbbb"
| 13 || June 19 || 7:00pm || @ Indiana ||  || L 91-94 || Catchings, Douglas (17) || Catchings (7) || Catchings (6) || Conseco Fieldhouse  8,187 || 9-4
|- bgcolor="bbffbb"
| 14 || June 23 || 12:00pm || Tulsa || NBATVSSOFS-OK || W 96-90 || McCoughtry (29) || Lyttle (12) || Castro Marques (8) || Philips Arena  9,598 || 10-4
|- bgcolor="bbffbb"
| 15 || June 27 || 3:00pm || Los Angeles || NBATVSSO || W 89-81 || Castro Marques (25) || Lyttle (11) || Lehning, McCoughtry (5) || Philips Arena  7,855 || 11-4
|- bgcolor="bbffbb"
| 16 || June 29 || 7:00pm || Phoenix || SSO || W 94-88 || McCoughtry (18) || Leuchanka (9) || K. Miller (8) || Philips Arena  4,073 || 12-4
|-

|- bgcolor="bbffbb"
| 17 || July 1 || 7:00pm || Minnesota || SSO || W 76-58 || Castro Marques (22) || Lyttle (14) || Lehning (5) || Philips Arena  4,020 || 13-4
|- bgcolor="ffbbbb"
| 18 || July 3 || 7:00pm || Chicago || NBATVSSO || L 82-88 || McCoughtry (20) || de Souza (15) || Lyttle, K. Miller (3) || Philips Arena  6,920 || 13-5
|- bgcolor="bbffbb"
| 19 || July 7 || 7:00pm || Connecticut || SSO || W 108-103 (OT) || Castro Marques, McCoughtry (32) || de Souza (13) || Lehning (8) || Philips Arena  5,305 || 14-5
|- bgcolor="ffbbbb"
| 20 || July 14 || 1:00pm || @ Minnesota ||  || L 81-83 || McCoughtry (25) || de Souza (20) || Lehning (6) || Target Center  12,311 || 14-6
|- bgcolor="ffbbbb"
| 21 || July 16 || 7:00pm || @ Indiana ||  || L 70-89 || McCoughtry (27) || Leuchanka (7) || Lehning (3) || Conseco Fieldhouse  7,532 || 14-7
|- bgcolor="ffbbbb"
| 22 || July 17 || 7:00pm || @ Connecticut ||  || L 80-96 || McCoughtry (27) || Lyttle (11) || Castro Marques, Price (5) || Mohegan Sun Arena  7,378 || 14-8
|- bgcolor="ffbbbb"
| 23 || July 21 || 11:30am || @ Washington || NBATVCSN-MA || L 72-82 || McCoughtry (23) || Lyttle (8) || Castro Marques (6) || Verizon Center  14,347 || 14-9
|- bgcolor="bbffbb"
| 24 || July 25 || 3:00pm || New York || NBATVSSO || W 82-75 || McCoughtry (28) || de Souza, McCoughtry (10) || McCoughtry (6) || Philips Arena  7,030 || 15-9
|- bgcolor="bbffbb"
| 25 || July 27 || 1:30pm || @ Tulsa || NBATVCOX || W 105-89 || Castro Marques (23) || Lyttle (14) || Lehning (6) || BOK Center  3,800 || 16-9
|- bgcolor="bbffbb"
| 26 || July 30 || 7:30pm || @ Connecticut ||  || W 94-62 || McCoughtry (20) || de Souza (13) || K. Miller, Price (5) || Mohegan Sun Arena  7,003 || 17-9
|-

|- bgcolor="bbffbb"
| 27 || August 1 || 3:00pm || Indiana || NBATVSSO || W 90-74 || Castro Marques (22) || Lyttle (8) || Lehning, McCoughtry (7) || Philips Arena  6,270 || 18-9
|- bgcolor="ffbbbb"
| 28 || August 3 || 7:30pm || Washington || ESPN2 || L 78-86 || McCoughtry (30) || Lyttle (9) || Lehning (6) || Philips Arena  9,072 || 18-10
|- bgcolor="ffbbbb"
| 29 || August 6 || 7:00pm || @ Indiana ||  || L 93-95 || McCoughtry (31) || Lyttle (8) || Lehning (6) || Conseco Fieldhouse  9,214 || 18-11
|- bgcolor="ffbbbb"
| 30 || August 10 || 7:00pm || Seattle || FS-S || L 70-80 || McCoughtry (16) || Lyttle (17) || Lehning (6) || Philips Arena  6,042 || 18-12
|- bgcolor="ffbbbb"
| 31 || August 13 || 7:00pm || New York || SSO || L 83-90 || McCoughtry (22) || Lyttle (13) || Lehning (8) || Philips Arena  6,025 || 18-13
|- bgcolor="bbffbb"
| 32 || August 14 || 8:00pm || @ Chicago || CN100 || W 92-74 || de Souza (17) || Bales (12) || Price (6) || Allstate Arena  4,214 || 19-13
|- bgcolor="ffbbbb"
| 33 || August 17 || 7:00pm || Chicago || NBATVFS-S || L 79-84 || Castro Marques (19) || Leuchanka (11) || Lehning, Miller (4) || Philips Arena  5,209 || 19-14
|- bgcolor="ffbbbb"
| 34 || August 22 || 3:00pm || Washington || SSO || L 81-90 || McCoughtry (19) || Lyttle (11) || Lyttle (6) || Philips Arena  9,570 || 19-15
|-

Playoffs

|- style="background:#fcc;"
| 1
| August 22
| Chicago
| L 77-80
| Angel McCoughtry (24)
| Sancho Lyttle (14)
| Shoni Schimmel (6)
| Philips Arena5,985
| 0–1
|- style="background:#cfc;"
| 2
| August 24
| @ Chicago
| W 92-83
| Angel McCoughtry (39)
| LyttleThomas (7)
| Jasmine Thomas (6)
| Allstate Arena4,546
| 1–1
|- style="background:#fcc;"
| 3
| August 26
| Chicago
| L 80-81
| Erika de Souza (18)
| Sancho Lyttle (13)
| Shoni Schimmel (6)
| Philips Arena4,829
| 1–2
|-

Standings

Playoffs

Statistics

Regular Season

Playoffs

Awards and Honors

References

External links

Atlanta Dream seasons
Atlanta
Atlanta Dream